Hill Top is an unincorporated community in McCreary County, Kentucky, United States.

A post office was established in the community in 1925, and named for its scenic overlooks.

References

Unincorporated communities in McCreary County, Kentucky
Unincorporated communities in Kentucky